Bangor is a village in the Canadian province of Saskatchewan within the Rural Municipality of Fertile Belt No. 183 and Census Division No. 5.

History 
Bangor was settled in 1902 by descendants of Welsh families who had migrated to Patagonia in 1860. Conflicts with the Argentine authorities and a flood in 1899 led some 250 to migrate again. At the urging of David Lloyd George and Evan Jenkins, one of their fellow Welsh Patagonians who had migrated to Canada earlier, they moved to Saskatchewan.

Bangor incorporated as a village on June 8, 1911. The Grand Trunk Pacific Railway was going to name the community Basco, but the Welsh settlers convinced them to change it to be named after the community of Bangor in Wales.

Demographics 

See also 

 List of communities in Saskatchewan
 Villages of Saskatchewan

References

Villages in Saskatchewan
Fertile Belt No. 183, Saskatchewan
Division No. 5, Saskatchewan